Jim Tierney (born 2 May 1940) is a Scottish former professional footballer who played as a winger.

Career
Born in Ayr, Tierney played for Saltcoats Victoria, Bradford City, Ayr United and Glenafton Athletic.

References

1940 births
Living people
Scottish footballers
Saltcoats Victoria F.C. players
Bradford City A.F.C. players
Ayr United F.C. players
Glenafton Athletic F.C. players
English Football League players
Scottish Football League players
Association football wingers